Seffner may refer to:

 Seffner, Florida
 Carl Seffner (1861–1932), German sculptor